Eu Chooi Yip (2 December 1918 - 4 October 1995) was a prominent member of the anti-colonial and Communist movements in Malaya and Singapore in the 1950s and 1960s. Eu Chooi Yip was born in Kuantan, Malaysia.

He was the Secretary of the Malayan Democratic Union (MDU), Singapore's first political party. He actively engaged in Anti-British League, established by the Malayan Communist Party (MCP) and was responsible for pro-communist propaganda productions. After Eu Chooi Yip joined the MCP, he was responsible for the underground communist movement in Singapore from the 1950s to 1960s. He was the Secretary-General of the United Front of the MCP, called Malayan National Liberation League, which set its office in Beijing. During the Cultural Revolution, he was one of the directors taking in charge of the radio station, the voice of Malayan Revolution. In 1990, he returned to Singapore after receiving the invitation from the Singapore government. Eu Chooi Yip served as a senior research fellow at Institute of East Asian philosophy in Singapore. He died on 4 October 1995, aged 76.

Biography

Early life and education 
Eu was born on 2 December 1918 in Kuantan, Malaysia. Eu's parents came from Taishan, Guangdong, and operated a medicine shop in Malaysia. He came to Singapore to study with his brother and sister. He attended Victoria School while his sister went to Nanyang Girls' High School. As a child, he was taught by his sister about Sino-Japanese War, and he understood how Chinese people suffered under Japanese occupation. At that time, the Chinese Communist Party established a Nanyang branch which organised communist movements among overseas Chinese and also influenced Eu. In 1938, Eu received an entrance scholarship to enter Raffles College. Eu was a brilliant student who is good at economics and became one of the top graduates at Raffles College. He was a close friend of Goh Keng Swee, who will become Singapore's Deputy Prime Minister, whom he knew during his Raffles College days. As a Chinese student, Eu was politically aroused by China's struggle against Japan. He became interested in politics and developed Chinese nationalism. Although he also read Edgar Snow's Book, Red Star over China and developed respect toward the Chinese Communist Party, he did not totally accept communism.

Malayan Democratic Union 
After graduation in 1940, Eu worked as a Labour Inspector for the colonial government in Kuala Lumpur. When Japanese attack Kuala Lumpur in 1942, Eu moved to Singapore and worked as a clerk for Overseas Insurance Company. When Japanese occupied Singapore, he worked in statistical offices for a while. After Japan surrendered, he went back to work for the colonial government. When the Chinese leftist writer, Hu Yuzhi, published an article in Fengxia magazine in 1945 which criticised slavish colonial mentality, he felt ashamed for his experience of serving the British and Japanese colonial government.

The Malayan Democratic Union, the first fledged political party, was formed in Singapore in December 1945 by English-educated intellectuals, such as Lim Hong Bee, Lim Kean Chye, John Eber and Philip Hoalim. Eu resigned and joined the MDU as a full-time activist in Singapore in 1946 and became a stringer for the English language newspaper, the Straits Times. In preparation for independence of post-war Malaya, the British colonial administration provided the Constitutional Proposals for Malaya, or the Federation Proposals, which failed to balance the interests of Malays and non-Malays. The Federation Proposals met the demands of conservative Malays of the United Malays National Organisation (UMNO) that Malaya was constitutionally a Malay state and rejected the equal rights of non-Malays. The MDU worked together with Malayan Communist Party and the Malay Nationalist Party to organise anti-Federation movements, which led to the establishment of All-Malayan Council of Joint Action (AMCJA) and Pusat Tenaga Ra'ayat (PUTERA). The AMCJA-PUTERA coalition demanded a self-governing United Malaya including Singapore and equal rights to all citizens. In 1947, Eu replaced Lim Hong Bee as MDU Secretary. Although the ALL Malaya Hartal was successful, the colonial government did not concede and the coalition had financial shortage for the second Hartal. In April 1948, member organisations of the coalition held the last conference. Eu proposed to decentralise the AMCJA-PUTERA coalition that each member organisation of the coalition could conduct agitation against the Federation constitution and member organisations were not allowed to act in the name of the AMCJA-PUTERA unless permitted by the general conference. This conference actually dismantled AMCJA-PUTERA, and the MDU which ascribed the result to financial stringencies dissolved voluntarily. The more important factor leading to the dissolution of the AMCJA-PUTERA was that the MCP had already lost the faith in the constitutional struggle and turned toward armed revolution. As the result, the Malayan Emergency began in 1948 June, and the MCP was outlawed by the government. At that time, Eu rejected the connection between the AMCJA and the MCP and claimed that he gave his loyalty to Malaya and he was not a Communist. At the time, Eu was described as an English-educated radical, along with P.V. Sarma, John Eber and Dr. Joseph K.M. Tan. They were pro-communist sympathies, but they were still not communists.

Conversion to a Communist Member 
The MCP established the Anti-British League (ABL) and the student organisations in 1948, which strongly influenced Eu's left-wing thoughts. One MCP leader, Ah Chin, made a decision to extend its influence among English-educated intelligentsia and absorb suitable ones into the party. The English-speaking section leader of the ABL, Wong Siong Nien, was sent to persuade Eu. Eu started to embrace communism in at the end of 1948 and actively engaged in the ABL. As Eu had a bachelor's degree and can speak both Mandarin and English, as an intellectual among MCP members, he was given a lot of responsibilities. Eu began to develop Communist Underground in Singapore and recruit ABL members among both English-speaking and Chinese-speaking intellectuals. A large number of students in University of Malaya who were political radicals engaged in clandestine activities and developed connections with the ABL and the MCP. He successfully persuaded his three MDU colleagues P.V. Sarma, Dr. Joseph K.M. Tan, Lim Chan Yong, and Lim Kean Chye to join in the communist party. They visited middle-class families to collect donation for the MCP and the ABL activities. He worked an editor for the Freedom News, which distributed communist propaganda productions. Lim Chan Yong and Joseph K.M. Tan founded pro-communist paper, Malayan Orchid. They distributed these propaganda productions from door to door. Due to the efforts of Eu Chooi Yip, the Chinese-speaking ABL recruited 2000 members in June 1950, including Worker's ABL and Students’ ABL. A number of ABL members gained admission into the MCP through ABL activities, including Eu Chooi Yip who became an official member of the MCP in 1950.

The British colonial government had a real fight against communist members in 1951. The police arrested members of the ABL and clear the leftwing group active in the Singapore Teachers’ Union, the Singapore Cooperative Society and the University of Malaya. The active members of former MDU and ABL were arrested by the police, such as John Eber and Dr Joseph K.M. Tan. Many students were also detained and charged with editing pro-communist paper. Eu Chooi Yip and Lim Kean Chye escaped the police arrest, because they went to Beijing for exchange.

Eu's close friend, S Rajaratnam gave him shelter while he was hiding from the British during this time and helped Eu get medical treatment for his tuberculosis. As the colonial government was suppressing the communist movement in Singapore, Eu was asked to go to Jakarta, Indonesia under the order of Yeung Kuo, deputy secretary general of the MCP, and continued his work for the MCP.

Working in Jakarta as a Communist Party leader 
In Jakarta, Eu established a party branch, which directed the communist activities in Singapore remotely. He took direct orders from Chin Peng, the secretary-general of MCP, and was the superior of Fong Chong Pik. The MCP planned to co-operate with Lee Kuan Yew and trying to help establish the People's Action Party (PAP). The truth of the story between the MCP and Lee Kuan Yew remains controversial, because Eu, Fong Chong Pik, and Lee Kuan Yew had different claims about the event. According to Eu Chooi Yip, Party committee in Indonesia and Chin Peng did not give Fong Chong Pik the authority, but Fong Chong Pik voluntarily took charge of all party affairs in Singapore and began to meet with Lee Kuan Yew. In 1957, Eu Chooi Yip went back to Singapore to observe the general election. After the meeting with Eu, Fong Chong Pik went to meet Lee Kuan Yew and talked about co-operation. Fong Chong Pik claimed that he was appointed as the Party representative and LKY game him the nickname "the Plen". LKY claimed that Fong wanted to establish co-operation in the united anti-colonial front with the PAP during his broadcast. As the MCP received support from the masses, especially the left-wings, the MCP's support for the PAP would help LKY win the election. In addition, the MCP expected that LKY would not take actions against the communist party after he got the power. However, Lee Kuan Yew were very strict against the communist party when he got the power in Singapore. As the Barisan Sosialis split from the PAP, the MCP realised that they could not co-operate with Lee Kuan Yew. Fong Chong Pik was prevented to meet with Lee any more, before Lee initiated Operation Cold Store.

In the early 1960s, when Sukarno served as the president of Indonesia, the MCP could organise activities publicly. Through the co-operation with Communist Party of Indonesia, Eu established Malayan National Liberation League. In 1963, he served as the secretary of the Southern Bureau of the MCP and made guidelines for underground activities in Singapore. To avoid a concentration of members in Jakarta and prepare for the resumption of underground activities in Malaya, many party members were sent to Medan, Aceh, Bagansiapiapi of Sumatra and to Bintan Island and Batam Island of the Riau islands, in mid-1964. These member helped to establish new bases or new liaison stations.

However, after the 30 September Movement in 1965 that suppressed the Communist movements in Indonesia, Eu was arrested, and later released to China. The MCP began to operate secretly and no institutions were open publicly. The Malayan National Liberation League which was open publicly in Beijing actually represented the MCP, and Eu served as the Secretary-General.

Director of the Voice of Malayan Revolution in Sifang Mountain 
When the MCP retreated to the border between Malaysia and Thailand, a radio station called "the Voice of Malayan Revolution" was also established which broadcast battlefield reports of Malayan Peoples’ Liberation Army. As the radio station was destroyed by the Malaysian Army in July 1968, Mao Zedong helped the MCP rebuilt the radio station in Sifang Mountain, Changsha, Hunan Province in 1969 (during the period of Cultural Revolution). The radio station used four languages, Chinese, Malay, Tamil and English, to broadcast in Southeast Asia. Eu was director of the radio station's Chinese branch. The broadcast scripts of the Voice of Malayan Revolution were recorded by a group of Barisan Sosialis members, including historian C. C. Chin. They completed the texts and published them in the Singapore leftist newspapers, such as Zhenxian Bao (Front), Party News, and People's Forum. These newspapers routinely published the frequency and wavelength of the radio station. A number of "red" cartoons, photos, and poems are also published. After the Operation Cold Store, the Barisan Sosialis lost its ability to compete with the PAP, but it was still significant opposition party. However, by using the rhetoric of Cultural Revolution, the Barisan's political agenda was dramatically radicalised which led to self-destruction. The left in Singapore isolated themselves by following the political line of Mao's China and they no longer received support from the people, which gave the PAP's confidence to fight the left through legal means.

The radio station of "the Voice of Malayan Revolution" which was operated in the border between Malaysia and Thailand was very effective. According to Chen Yinghong, the radio broadcast strongly influenced members in guerrilla of the MCP. Party members studied quotations from Mao Zedong and sang "Red Songs". People were interested in the battlefield reports of guerrilla of the MCP. A number of young people in Southeast Asian were encouraged to join in the MCP. However, the new radio station in Sifang Mountain failed to attract young people to join the communist party. The Chinese Communist Party only provided technical support for the radio broadcast and did not give any suggestions for the press releases. Eu and his colleagues did not have news resources, and they just looked for the news from the public newspapers and paraphrased in a pro-communist way, so that the news were not well written. The main sources of newspaper were Sinchew, Nanyang, Straits Times, Utusan Melayu and other newspaper from Hong Kong. As young people were interested in the battlefield reports, the radio failed to provide. People who listened to the radio found that the news releases were similar to the news in public newspapers and the only differences were the perspectives. Therefore, the propaganda of radio station in China was not effective.

Return to Singapore 
In the early 1980s, when Deng Xiaoping came into power, China stopped Cultural Revolution, planned to have normal diplomatic relationship with countries in Southeast Asia. Therefore, the revolution in Southeast Asia is no longer supported, and the "Voice of Malayan Revolution" was revoked. The non-Chinese citizens who were willing to stay in China were arranged jobs. Eu was arranged to teach English in Changsha Railway University in Hunan. In 1989, Singapore and China started negotiations to establish diplomatic relations. Eu's classmate in Raffles College, the Deputy Prime Minister of Singapore, Goh Keng Swee, sent him a message through the Chinese International Liaison Department that invited him to work as a consultant for the negotiations. Eu accepted the invitation and later returned to Singapore in 1991. He served as a senior research fellow at Institute of East Asian philosophy in Singapore, until his death in 1995.

Eu Chooi Yip's reflection on revolutionary history 
Eu Chooi Yip helped to create an oral history interview, Lang Jian Zhu Meng (Pursuing Dreams beyond the High Seas: Oral History of Eu Chooi Yip) and Political History in Singapore 1945-1965. In these books, he provided his own reflections on revolutionary history in Southeast Asia, including his opinions on the development and failure of the MCP.

The contribution of the MCP 
Eu Chooi Yip experienced the whole period of Maoist revolution in Southeast Asia. He believes that the MCP has great contribution in the history. This contribution has two main parts. First, the MCP participated in the battle against fascism during World War II. The MCP cooperated with the British Special Operations Executive, Force 136 and became an important regional power of the allied in Southeast Asia. As the ultimate goal of the MCP was to seize power of all states, the MCP fought hard against the Japanese invaders. Military leaders (Chin Peng) of the MCP were awarded for Order of the British Empire after the war. The second contribution of the MCP is their struggle against British colonial rule. After World War II, the United Kingdom planned to prevent the expansion of communism and continue to maintain its colonial rule in Malaya. The MCP launched an armed struggle against colonialism and forced the British to abandon its colonial rule in Malaya and Singapore. Finally the UK gave the ruling power to the Malaysian nationalists.

The failure of the MCP 
When Malaysia got independence in the 1957, the country was on the way of nation-building and development. However, Eu Chooi Yip believed that the MCP failed because it did not recognise the legitimacy of Malaysia. The plan of the MCP was to build a Maoist regime in Malaya through armed struggle. This plan limited party's attractiveness to the a few number of extreme left-wing Maoists in the Malaysia and lose the support from the masses, so that the MCP finally retreated to the border of Malaysia and Thailand. At that time, the ethnic and political conflicts are very intense in Malaysia and Singapore. Eu Chooi Yip believe that the MCP could have called on the masses to revolt against the governments through inciting political suppression and ethnic riots. However, the MCP lost those chances to receive the support from the masses, which indicated its failure at the end.

During the late 1970s, when Eu Chooi Yip was working in "Voice of Malayan Revolution", he was trying to find answers that why the MCP was not able to receive support from the masses. He believes that the land reform policies made by the MCP were wrong. The MCP claimed that Malaya was a colonial society, and farmers were the fundamental strength of the revolution. Those claims, Eu Chooi Yip believed, were copied from the theories of Mao Zedong. Eu Chooi Yip received some academic books and journal articles from Malaysia and Singapore and focused on the social structure of Malaya, especially the rural class structure.  He found that in Malaya, farmers rent lands from the British colonial government, and the rent was very low. Unlike Chinese farmer, Malayan farmers were smallholders and did not have any obligations. They planted rubbers and could be self-sustainable. Thus, Malaya's agricultural economy was capitalist economy. There was no landlord class ruling the Malayan village and Malayan farmers had no desire of revolution. As a result, Maoist theories that farmers were the main power of revolution and "surround the cities from the countryside" were impracticable in Malaya. Maoist theory was approved to be successful in China. As the MCP had been using Maoist theory as their guiding ideology for decades, and Maoist theory was also the foundation of the MCP's guerrilla warfare, changing guiding ideology and developing another theory could lead to devastating results to the party. The leaders of MCP were not able to recognise that they made theoretical mistake and copying Maoist theory led to the failure of the MCP.

The Significance of Studying Eu Chooi Yip 
Eu Chooi Yip has two significant academic values. First, he provides a typical example that how an English-educated intellectual converted to a communist
member. According to Yeo Kim Wah, when Eu Chooi Yip received a lot of
information about China's struggle against Japan and developed strong nationalism. He developed anti-colonialism through actively engaging in student political movements in Singapore, such as the Malayan Democratic Union and the Anti-British League. These political movements were influenced by left-wing thoughts and supported by the Malayan Communist Party. After the success of communist revolution in China, Eu Chooi Yip accepted communist as his belief. Second, Eu Chooi Yip was an important leader of the MCP. The Chinese Scholar Cheng Yinghong had a deep analysis of him and believes that Eu Chooi Yip's reflection on communist movements in Malaya is important, because it helps people understand the influence of Mao's Cultural Revolution in Southeast Asia, the relationship between Deng's China and Southeast Asian countries, and the Communist Revolutions during the Cold War.

References

Malaysian communists
Malaysian emigrants to Singapore
Singaporean people of Cantonese descent
Victoria School, Singapore alumni
1995 deaths
Malaysian politicians
1918 births